The Order of Kuwait (Wisam al-Kuwait) is an award given by the State of Kuwait. It ranks below the Order of Mubarak the Great.

The Order of Kuwait was founded in 1974 by Amir Sabah III. It was reformed and modified in 1991. It is awarded "For outstanding service to the nation".

Grades
The Order of Kuwait is awarded in one of eight grades. In descending order:

 Riband of the Special Class
 1st Class
 Medallion of the Special Class
 Medallion of the 1st Class
 2nd Class
 3rd Class
 4th Class
 5th Class

Insignia

References

Orders, decorations, and medals of Kuwait
Awards established in 1974
1974 establishments in Kuwait